Koh-Lanta: L'Île des héros is the twenty-fourth season and the sixth special season of the French version of Survivor, Koh-Lanta. This season, for the first time in Koh-Lanta, fourteen new contestants will be playing alongside five All-Stars who have never won the game. The five All-Stars will compete in a series of challenges to join one of the two tribes. In addition, two of the new contestants were former contestants on the cancelled season in 2018. The one All-Star who fails to win the challenges will be eliminated. The season premiered on 21 February 2020.

Contestants

Futures appearances 
Teheiura returned in the third episode of Koh-Lanta: Les Armes Secrètes, after the reward challenge. The winning tribe had the occasion to spend some time in Teheiura's home in Polynesia. Sam Haliti, Teheiura Teahui and Claude Dartois returned for Koh-Lanta: La Légende.

Voting history

Notes

References

External links

French reality television series
Koh-Lanta seasons
2020 French television seasons
Television shows filmed in Fiji